Rodrigo Sperafico (born 23 July 1979) is a Brazilian professional racing driver. He currently drives in the Stock Car Brasil series.  He belongs to the Sperafico family of racing drivers, which includes twin brother Ricardo (with whom his career has been closely linked), along with cousins Alexandre and the late Rafael.

Career

Formula Ford
Sperafico raced in the British Formula Ford Championship in 1997.  Driving a Mygale chassis, he finished ninth in the final championship standings, behind Ricardo who finished second and then took third place in the annual Formula Ford Festival.

Formula Three
The brothers took the unusual step of returning to South America for 1998 by competing in the Formula Three Sudamericana series.  On this occasion, Rodrigo fared the better, finishing seventh to Ricardo's ninth.  The following year, the pair both raced Dallara chassis for the Amir Nasr Racing team and proved closely matched: Rodrigo and Ricardo improved to third and fourth overall, behind champion Hoover Orsi and runner-up Jaime Melo.

Formula 3000
The Speraficos returned to Europe in 2000 to race in the Italian Formula 3000 series.  Rodrigo signed for the Draco Junior Team alongside compatriot Leonardo Nienkötter, and finished fourth in the championship with one pole position and three podium finishes to his name.  He finished behind Gabriele Lancieri, Warren Hughes and Ricardo, who was the drivers' champion.

For the following year, the brothers switched to the more prestigious International Formula 3000 championship; Rodrigo signed for Coloni alongside the experienced Fabrizio Gollin, whilst Ricardo partnered Antônio Pizzonia at the Super Nova Racing-run Petrobras Junior Team.  Whilst Ricardo finished an impressive fifth in the championship, including a win at the Spa-Francorchamps circuit, Rodrigo's season was less successful: although he finished every race he started, he did not score any points, although he lost a potential podium finish at his home race after being penalised for overtaking under yellow flags. He was replaced by Marc Goossens after nine of the calendar's twelve races after his sponsorship deal ran out.

Sperafico tested for several teams in the off-season period, including Arden and Astromega. However, he eventually signed for the Durango team for the 2002 season, along with Alex Müller (who was later replaced by Derek Hill). He again competed alongside Ricardo, who kept his seat in the Petrobras team, and also on the occasion his cousin Alexandre, who moved up to International F3000 for a part-season with the Coloni-run Minardi junior team. Rodrigo began the championship strongly, winning the first race of the season at his home track of Interlagos, but was fortunate to take the victory as hitherto dominant leader Tomáš Enge suffered a mechanical problem. He then finished a close second to eventual title winner Sébastien Bourdais at the next race in Imola to take the championship lead. Thereafter his campaign faltered through inconsistency, and he took only one further podium finish. He eventually finished sixth in the championship, two points and one position behind Ricardo.

World Series by Nissan
Sperafico also competed in eight races of the 2002 World Series by Nissan season for the Meycom team, finishing 18th in the championship with 12 points.  He failed to retain a drive in F3000 for 2003 and took the year out, before returning to the World Series with the Vergani Racing team for four races of the 2004 season, in which he did not score any points.

Stock Car Brasil

During 2004, Sperafico moved back to Brazil to drive in the Stock Car Brasil championship, his single-seater career having effectively ended.  Driving a part-season, he finished 25th in the championship.  The following year he drove a Chevrolet Astra for the WB Motorsport team, improving to 13th in the standings and taking a podium finish on the way. For 2006 he drove an Astra for JF Racing, and climbed to ninth place overall with three podiums.

For 2007, Sperafico again switched teams to Action Power, who also provided him with a different car, the Volkswagen Bora.  He was joined in the series for the first time by Ricardo, who had also moved back to Brazil by this point in his own career.  In his strongest season to date, which included three pole positions and two victories, Rodrigo finished runner-up to champion Cacá Bueno.  The championship was marred, however, by the death of his cousin Rafael in a Stock Car Light race which supported the final Stock Car Brasil event of the season.

Sperafico moved to a Mitsubishi Lancer run by the Avallone Motorsport in 2008 called Terra Racing team for 2008, but faded to 14th in the championship.  He drove a Peugeot 307 for part of the 2009 season, and also competed in the Copa Vicar. He reverted to a Bassani-run Chevrolet Astra for the 2010 season, but could only manage 24th position in the championship after leaving the team after two races, and then missing the next three races before returning to action with the Mico's Racing team.

Racing record

Career summary

Complete Italian Formula 3000 results
(key) (Races in bold indicate pole position; races in italics indicate fastest lap)

Complete International Formula 3000 results

Complete Stock Car Brasil results

† Ineligible for championship points.

References

External links

Stock Car Brasil-based profile at forix.autosport.com

1979 births
Living people
Brazilian racing drivers
Formula Ford drivers
Formula 3 Sudamericana drivers
Auto GP drivers
International Formula 3000 drivers
Stock Car Brasil drivers
People from Toledo, Paraná
Rodrigo
Sportspeople from Paraná (state)
Draco Racing drivers
Scuderia Coloni drivers
Durango drivers